The title of Earl of Hereford was created six times in the Peerage of England. Dates indicate the years the person held the title for.

Earls of Hereford, First Creation (1043)
Swegen Godwinson (1043–1051)
earldom forfeit 1051–1052

Earls of Hereford, Second Creation (1052)
Ralph the Timid, Earl of Hereford (1052–1057)
earldom extinct 1057–1058

Earls of Hereford, Third Creation (1058)
Harold Godwinson, Earl of Hereford (later Harold II of England) (1058–1066)
earldom extinct 1066–1067

Earls of Hereford, Fourth Creation (1067)
William FitzOsbern, 1st Earl of Hereford (1067–1071)
Roger de Breteuil, 2nd Earl of Hereford (1071–1074)
earldom forfeit 1074–1141

Earls of Hereford, Fifth Creation (1141)
Miles de Gloucester, 1st Earl of Hereford (1141–1143)
Roger Fitzmiles, 2nd Earl of Hereford (1143–1155)
earldom extinct 1155–1199

Earls of Hereford, Sixth Creation (1199)

Henry de Bohun, 1st Earl of Hereford (1199–1220)
Humphrey de Bohun, 2nd Earl of Hereford (1220–1275)
Humphrey de Bohun, 3rd Earl of Hereford (1275–1298)
Humphrey de Bohun, 4th Earl of Hereford (1298–1322)
John de Bohun, 5th Earl of Hereford (1322–1336)
Humphrey de Bohun, 6th Earl of Hereford (1336–1361)
Humphrey de Bohun, 7th Earl of Hereford (1361–1373)
Heiresses:
Eleanor de Bohun (c. 1366 – 1399), who married Thomas of Woodstock; their great-great-great-grandson Walter Devereux was created Viscount Hereford in 1550
Mary de Bohun  (c. 1368 – 1394), who married Henry of Bolingbroke, the future King Henry IV of England; he was created Duke of Hereford in 1397

See also
Duke of Hereford
Viscount Hereford

References

Earldoms in England before 1066
Extinct earldoms in the Peerage of England
Forfeited earldoms in the Peerage of England
Noble titles created in 1067
Noble titles created in 1141
Noble titles created in 1199